Rainey v Greater Glasgow Health Board [1987] IRLR 26 is a UK labour law case concerning the justifications for unequal pay.

Facts
Ms Rainey was a prosthetist. Men had been recruited from private practice, to the Board’s new prosthetic fitting service, which had previously been done by private contractors. The men had comparable qualifications and experience. They were paid 40% more. The women were directly recruited on the NHS pay scale. There had been no arrangements to phase out the pay disparities.

Judgment
Lord Keith, overturning Lord Denning in Clay Cross said that ‘material’ meant ‘significant and relevant’ and one should consider all the case’s circumstances, which may well go beyond personal qualities.

He noted the ECJ would probably not exclude administrative efficiency concerns. He then said that the Whitley Council pay scale had been the natural thing for the NHS women to join. It was an ‘accident’ that the people coming from the private sector were men.

See also

UK labour law
UK employment equality law

Notes

References

United Kingdom labour case law
House of Lords cases
1987 in case law
1987 in British law